The Kadıköy İnciburnu Feneri (aka Kadıköy Feneri or İnciburnu Feneri) is a lighthouse located at the head of Kadıköy Harbor's İnciburnu Breakwater on the Anatolian coast of Bosporus' south entrance, in Kadıköy district of Istanbul, Turkey. A line connecting the two lighthouses marks the southern boundary of the Port of Istanbul.

It went on October 13, 1977, in service.

Kadıköy İnciburnu Feneri is equipped with a lantern of type Tideland ML-300 featuring a one-piece acrylic Fresnel lens of 300mm focal length. It is powered by solar energy producing 35 W.

References

Bosphorus
Kadıköy
Lighthouses completed in 1977
Lighthouses in Istanbul
Sea of Marmara
Towers completed in 1977